This is a list of all recurring/semi-regular cast members over the Australian television programme Blue Heelers 13 season run between 1994–2006.

A

Clive Adamson 
Chief Superintendent Clive Adamson was a fictional character in the long-running Australian police drama Blue Heelers. He originally appeared in the show between 1995 and 1996 as the regional Chief Superintendent based in the fictional city of Evanleigh and was usually only seen in Mount Thomas in the aftermath of some major drama. As a chief superintendent, he outranked the Heelers and also the district inspector and thus was not the favourite person of Ted Faulkner. He was quite a large man and came across as grandfatherly but was also a forceful leader. After a break of five years, Adamson returned to the series after Inspector Falcon-Price was abducted.

Portrayed by Terry Gill, 1995 – 1996, 2001

Sophie Ash 
Sophie Ash is a fictional character from Blue Heelers.
She appeared in 2005 and 2006.
She was a doctor at the Mount Thomas Hospital.

Portrayed by Stephanie Millar, 2005 – 2006

B

Gina Belfanti 
Gina Belfanti was a fictional character in the long-running Australian police drama Blue Heelers. She was an ambulance officer in Mount Thomas and lived with Maggie. She joined the Heelers in 1995 and stayed until 1997 when she died in hospital during the opening episode of season 4 (it was revealed in the next episode that she died from Encephalitis). She had a one-night stand with Adam Cooper before being raped later that night. She also had a brief relationship with P.J Hasham, before realising he had feelings for Maggie.

Portrayed by Rachel Blakely, 1995 – 1997

C

Josh Carmichael 
Doctor Josh Carmichael was a fictional character in the long-running Australian police drama Blue Heelers from 2002 until 2003.

Portrayed by Daniel Fredrikson, 2002 – 2003

Mel Carter 
Mel Carter was a fictional character on Blue Heelers. She was a Doctor and replaced Jasmine Farrah. She was first introduced in season 6 episode 'Under Fire' (250). She first comes across as vicious and impatient, however this can be explained as she was under stressful situation as she was helping with the bus crash.

Portrayed by Suzi Dougherty, 1999 – 2002

Charlie Clarke 
Charlie Clarke was a fictional character in the long-running Australian police drama Blue Heelers. He was Mount Thomas' plumber, but was quite slack when it came to plumbing itself. He quite often made work for the Heelers and was once suspected of the murder of his wife, Cheryl, who he refers to as 'the minister for war'. He lives out of town with his wife and his dog, Dylan, named after Bob Dylan.

Portrayed by Don Bridges, 1996 – 2003

Leila Clegg 
Leila Clegg was a fictional character in the long-running Australian police drama Blue Heelers who could quite often be found at the Imperial Pub  havin' a quick drink. She was quite old lady, who became quite good friends with Nick and "Tommy" and became involved with many police activities, one even taking part in a drug bust. She was portrayed by Marie Trevor who had also had a guest role in Blue Heelers before she started playing Leila in 1996.

Portrayed by Marie Trevor, 1996 – 2000

Ellis Corby 
Ellis Corby was a fictional character in the long-running Australian police drama Blue Heelers. He was a lawyer in the series from 1995–2005. He was portrayed by Adam May who initially appeared in the series as an ambulance officer.

Portrayed by Adam May, 1997 – 2005

Marissa Craddock 
Marissa Craddock' was a fictional character who was in the Salvation army and was Marrying Ben. but that all ended when she found out Ben wasn't ready to be married nor having a relationship with her.

Portrayed by Heidi Arena, 2003 – 2004

Anna Croydon 
Anna Croydon is a fictional character on the long-running series Blue Heelers. She first appeared in 1996 and was last seen in the 2006 series final. She has been married twice, the first time to an Indian man. While married to him, she had an affair with her current husband Brett Allcott. They have been married since 1996 and have two children, Sam and Daisy.

Portrayed by Alexandra Sangster, 1996, 2005–2006

Nell Croydon 
Nell Croydon was a character in the Australian series Blue Heelers since it began in 1994 although she was never seen throughout the series, she was spoken about regularly. She was the wife of Mount Thomas' officer-in-charge, Tom Croydon. She died in the season two episode Luck of the Draw. Nell suffered a 'heart turn' at the wheel while driving back from Melbourne with her daughter Susan. As a result, her car drove onto the wrong side of the road just outside Mount Thomas and had a head-on collision with another car that left three teenagers dead and Susan in hospital. She also appeared in season six episode 'Starry Starry Night' as a figment of Tom's imagination. She was portrayed by [Leigh Morgan].

1994

Susan Croydon 
Susan Croydon was a fictional character in the long-running Australian police drama Blue Heelers. She was Tom Croydon's daughter and we see her first in the first series when she is involved in the fatal car accident that killed Nell Croydon, her mother and Tom Croydon's wife. She eventually becomes a teacher, but not before she battles with the education department for her career, trying to prove to them that she no longer has anything to do with drugs.

Portrayed by Beth Buchanan, 1994 – 2006

Daniel Curtis 
Daniel Curtis was a fictional character in the long-running Australian police drama Blue Heelers from 2001 until 2004. Daniel was the elder of Tom's two stepsons in his marriage to Grace Curtis.

Portrayed by Kane McNay, 2001 – 2003

Portrayed by Abe Forsyth, 2004

Grace Curtis 
Grace Curtis was a fictional character from Blue Heelers.
She appeared on a recurring basis between 2001 and 2004.
She was the second wife of Tom Croydon.
In 2004, she was raped and murdered by the Baxters (the people who blew up the Mount Thomas Station).

Portrayed by Debra Lawrance, 2001 – 2004

Nelson Curtis 
Nelson Curtis was a fictional character in Blue Heelers from 2001 until 2004. He was the younger of Tom's two stepsons, after he married Grace Curtis.
 
Portrayed by Darcy Bonser, 2001 – 2004

D

Detective Sergeant Paul Donald 
Detective Sergeant Paul Donald was a fictional character in the long-running Australian police drama Blue Heelers first portrayed by Marcus Eyre. Det Sgt Donald was a member of the Homicide Squad, he first appeared on Blue Heelers in 1996. Donald was involved in the investigation of Senior Constable Maggie Doyle's murder where he believed P.J was the murderer. Donald normally appeared on the show to work on a big case. In the show he was portrayed as a homosexual.

Portrayed by Marcus Eyre, 1996 – 2004

 Celia Donald 
Celia Donald was a fictional character in the long-running Australian police drama Blue Heelers first portrayed by Helen Trenos. She was a real-estate agent in the series from 1994–1997 and was a very sophisticated and confident woman and was always trying to talk someone into buying something. Celia was heavily involved in many different Mount Thomas organisations, such as the local Racing club. She was portrayed by Suzy Cato in 2000 and 2001 for a number of episodes. Through her connections, Celia usually knew about big happenings in Mt Thomas, such as a proposed psychiatric gaol, before anyone else in town does, even the Heelers. And she was never shy about spreading her information around the town, which usually stirred up trouble.Portrayed by Helen Trenos, 1994 – 1997 and Suzy Cato, 2000 – 2001 Sally Downie 
Sally Downie was a fictional character in the long-running Australian police drama Blue Heelers. She was a lawyer in the series from 1998–2000 and was portrayed by Catherine Wilkin. During Season 5 (1998) of the series, Sally and Tom embark on a relationship which lasts a number of episodes until they realise, coppers and lawyers don't mix.Portrayed by Catherine Wilkin, 1998 – 2000 Mick Doyle 
Mick Doyle was a recurring character in the long-running Australian police drama Blue Heelers. A member of the Ethical Standards Division (E.S.D.) of the Victorian Police, he appeared in the show from 1996 to 2000. He is the son of ex-Sergeant Pat Doyle, and the brother of Maggie and Robbie Doyle. Mick murdered Maggie, and was himself shot and killed by Pat after he had found out that Mick had killed Maggie.Portrayed by David Field, 1995, and Terry Serio, 1996 - 2000 Pat Doyle 
Pat Doyle was a recurring character from Australia's cop show Blue Heelers. A former Sergeant who was once stationed at Mt Thomas with a young Tom Croydon, he appeared between 1994 and 2000. Pat has three children — Maggie, Robbie and Mick — all of whom are deceased and former members of the Victoria Police. As of 2000, Pat is in prison after being charged with the murder of Mick, having shot his son when he discovered that Mick was not only corrupt, but that he had also murdered his own sister.Portrayed by Dennis Miller, 1994 – 2000 Robbie Doyle 
Robbie Doyle was a recurring character from Australia's cop show Blue Heelers. A former police officer, Robbie was suspended from the force after he was shown to have a drug problem. He appeared on the show between 1996 and 1998 with his primary storyline being his struggles to cope with his heroin addiction. He is shot dead while protecting Maggie from a crazed gunman in Widgeree.Portrayed by David Wenham, 1996, and Brett Climo, 1997 - 1998 Monica Draper 
Inspector Monica Draper was a fictional character who appeared on Blue Heelers on a recurring basis from 1995 to 2006. At her introduction to the series she was with IID (Internal Investigation Division), before being promoted to Senior Sergeant over Tom Croydon. Sometime during 1997 she was promoted to Inspector at St Davids replacing Ted Faulkner. She had a kind personality, but knew how to get the job done, and always let personal feelings get in the way. She seemed to be good friends with Tom Croydon, unlike her successor Inspector Falcon-Price. She found out about her son, who she had put up for adoption when she was 16, during season 5.

Before the series, Draper and P.J. worked on a task force together. It was revealed in Season 2 that Draper had found illegal activity going on in the task force (something P.J. also knew but turned a blind eye to) and her actions in reporting the activity had shut down the task force, and though he wasn't involved in anything illegal, it resulted in P.J. being posted to Mt Thomas.Portrayed by Peta Doodson*, 1995 – 2006* A registered nurse since 1972, Doodson was also the medical adviser to Blue Heelers. E 

 Hilary Edmunds 
Hilary Edmunds was a fictional character on Blue Heelers. She was an old flame of P.J's and she made guest appearances throughout the first season (1994).Portrayed by Jennifer Botica, 1994 Rose Egan 
Senior Constable Rose Egan was a fictional character in the long-running Australian police drama Blue Heelers. She was introduced in the series when she came to Mount Thomas police station to do some detective work with PJ as she was going for a job in CI. She was greeted with resentment from Maggie who also hoped to get the same job and she thought PJ was all for her getting it. She remained for several episodes until the station was deemed to have too many officers. Latest arrival Rose was transferred.Portrayed by Dale Stevens, 1994 – 1995 F 

 Russell Falcon-Price 
Russell Falcon-Price was a fictional character from Blue Heelers.
He appeared on a recurring basis between 1997 and 2006.  He was portrayed by Neil Pigot.
He was unpopular with most of the officers at the station and was known as 'Rusty'.
At the start of his tenure at St Davids, It was apparent that Russell was trying to get some dirt on Tom Croydon in a bid to get himself further in the force.
In 1999 (season 6), P.J implies that Falcon-Price is attracted to Maggie Doyle, when Maggie confronted him about this, he informs her that he was actually planning on giving her the vacant Sergeant's position. In 2003 (Season 10) Ben Stewart had an affair with the inspector's wife, Felicity. At the same time Falcon-Price showed interest in Jo Parrish (Jane Allsop). After a hostage situation involving the Falcon Price children, Ben stopped pursuing the relationship as it became apparent that it was not going anywhere.
In the series finale he was successful in closing the Mount Thomas Station down but the Station was reopened towards the end of the episode, when it became known that the evidence he had used was false.Portrayed by Neil Pigot, 1997 – 2006 Jasmine Farah 
Doctor Jasmine Farah was a fictional character in the long-running Australian police drama Blue Heelers and joined the Heelers in 1999. She was a doctor at the local Mount Thomas hospital and sometimes referred to as "The Persian Princess".Portrayed by Sapidah Kian, 1999 Ted Faulkner 
Inspector Edward 'Ted' Faulkner was a fictional character in the long-running Australian police drama Blue Heelers. He first appeared in the series in late 1994 and appeared as the district police inspector, stationed at St. David; he took the place of Inspector Murray. He left the series in 1996 when fast-tracker Inspector Russell Falcon-Price took over the job, Ted now seemed very gentle and low-key compared to Falcon-Price.Portrayed by Nick Waters, 1994 – 1996 Brad Fingleton 
Brad Fingleton was a fictional character in the long-running Australian police drama Blue Heelers. He first appeared in the series in late 2003 as Constable Suzie Raynor's husband- a former cop, who was struggling to come to terms with being in a wheelchair. In the final episode of Season 10 "Sexual Healing Part 2" Brad had stolen Constable Raynor's firearm. Both Acting Sergeant Stewart & Constable Raynor were concerned that Brad was going to use it on himself. When they arrived at his place he accused Ben & Suzie of having an affair; he pulled the gun on Suzie, giving Acting Sergeant Stewart no option but to fire and kill Brad.Portrayed by Matt Passmore, 2003 Clancy Freeman 
Clancy Freeman is a fictional character who appeared on a recurring basis in Blue Heelers.
He was a mentally disabled young man, who Tom Croydon had something of a soft spot for. When Clancy's mother died suddenly from cancer, Tom arranged for his home to be turned into a group home for other mentally disabled people. Clancy would not be lonely and would have a carer living with them all. This is where he met his girlfriend with whom he had a baby (Rachel). Unfortunately after a few months it appeared they were having trouble caring properly for the baby and a foster mother was needed. Tom helped with this transaction and made sure the parents could regularly visit with their daughter.

Clancy and Jo Parrish died in the bombing of the Mount Thomas Station in episode, 'End Of Innocence' in 2004.Portrayed by Michael Isaacs, 1995 – 2004 Hayley Fulton 
Hayley Fulton was a fictional character in the long-running Australian police drama Blue Heelers. She was a young, neglected child whom Tess took in and cared for until she lost her back to her real family.Portrayed by Emily Browning, 2000 – 2002 G 

 Ian Goss 
Senior Constable Ian Goss, based on a real person, and known as Gossie, was a fictional character on Blue Heelers. He was an old friend of Tom Croydon's, who landed the job of running the one man station at Widgeree in Season 8 (2001). As a Widgeree local, it was believed that he should be able to keep the usually quiet town of Widgeree at piece. In 2003, (Season 10) Gossie was involved in an incident that ultimately decided his fate as a Police officer; a young French filmmaker was killed in Widgeree in an incident Gossie should have prevented. Gossie later returned in 2006 (Season 13) as a shop owner with a grudge against his old mate Tom Croydon.

The real life Ian Goss "Gossie" was a Senior Constable of Police who served in a rural town approximately 42 km north of Melbourne, Victoria, Australia.  Gossie, as he was affectionately known to the community and his colleagues, was stationed at the rural town of Riddells Creek for approximately 20 years.  He was a typical 'country copper' who was respected by all.  His character was introduced into Blue Heelers by a Victoria Police Media Advisor who was a Sergeant with Victoria Police. That Sergeant was David O'Connor of Victoria's Western Region.

Widgeree Police Station was filmed at location at Clarkefield, Victoria, Australia.  This is a short distance south of Riddells Creek.  Clarkefield is famous for its hotel, which is reputed to be haunted.Portrayed by Roy Billing, 2001 – 2003, 2006 Peter Grantham 
Peter Grantham was a fictional character in the long-running Australian police drama Blue Heelers. Introduced in the first season, Grantham was a Detective Sergeant at St Davids and was technically P.J.'s direct superior but he was expelled from the force after he was proven to be corrupt. He reappeared in season 2 as the security manager for the local bank after the bank was robbed and P.J. fingered as an accomplice. Maggie and her father Pat were able to prove that Grantham framed P.J. and his plan for revenge was foiled.Portrayed by David Glazebrook, 1994 – 1995 H 

 Zoe Hamilton 
Zoe Hamilton was a fictional character on the long-running Australian police drama Blue Heelers. She was a doctor at Mount Thomas Hospital. Zoe played a part in the show from 1995 until 1998 when she married Sergeant Nick Schultz and they moved to Melbourne so she could study at Melbourne University. Nick took up a sergeant's position at Footscray police station.Portrayed by Karen Davitt*, 1995 – 1998* Davitt played a nurse named Karen at the Mt Thomas Hospital during season one before becoming Dr Hamilton in season 2.

 Alan 'Compo' Hayes 
Alan Hayes was a fictional character on the long-running Australian police drama Blue Heelers. Known around Mount Thomas as 'Compo', he was always cooking up some kind of scheme to get compensation or money. Despite his reputation, Compo was  a good citizen at times, organising a charity event to raise money for the CFA on one occasion, but using the opportunity to run an SP book.Portrayed by Tony Rickards, 1995 - 2003 Rory Hayes 
Rory Hayes is a fictional character in Australia's popular Police series Blue Heelers. He appeared in the season 12 finale and appeared on a recurring basis in the 13th and final season of the series.

Rory was 9 years old when he entered the series.  He came to the town of Mount Thomas dressed in a Darth Vader costume and claimed to be on a mission.  He later said that it was to find his father.  At first, it was thought that Evan Jones was his dad, but when Rory's mother arrived it was revealed that his father was Alex Kirby.
Rory had already become attached to Jonsey so he at first resented Alex.  In the episode "On The Lonely", after there was a shooting in front of the Primary School that Rory attended, he went missing and Alex panicked and was desperate to find him.  It turned out that Rory was just scared and went home.  When Alex found him he immediately ran over and hugged him, showing his love and concern for Rory.  Another episode that showed this was the episode when Rory was rushed to hospital with appendicitis.

In later episodes, Rory accepted Alex as his dad and the two developed a loving relationship.Portrayed by Louis Corbett of McKinnon Secondary College, 2005 – 2006 K 

 Siobhan Kennedy 
Siobhan Kennedy was a fictional character on the long-running Australian TV series Blue Heelers. A self-confessed witch, Siobhan was friendly with the Heelers, in particular Ben Stewart, even if they thought she was a bid odd. Siobhan was often asked to consult on cases involving the supernatural. She appeared on a recurring basis between 1996 and 1997 and again between 2000 and 2001.Portrayed by Rosalind Hammond, 1996 - 1997, and Marie-Louise Walker, 2000 - 2001 Harriet Keppell 
Harriet Keppell was a fictional character on the long-running Australian TV series Blue Heelers. She was a journalist who always seemed to get in the way. She appeared on a recurring basis from 1995–1996.Portrayed by Beverly Evans, 1995 – 1996 Tibor Kerenyi 
Dr. Tibor Kerenyi was a fictional character on the long-running Australian TV series Blue Heelers. He was the local veterinarian who was regularly called in to help the Heelers whenever their cases involved sick or injured animals. He appeared on a recurring basis from 1995 until 2001.Portrayed by Colin Duckworth, 1995 – 2001 L 

 Len the barman 
Len was a fictional character on Blue Heelers and was the barman in Mount Thomas' Imperial Pub.Portrayed by Axl Taylor, 1994 – 2002 M 

 Beth McKinley 
Beth McKinley was a fictional character in the long-running Australian police drama Blue Heelers and joined the cast in 1996 playing the mother of new Probationary Constable, Dash McKinley. Beth had 9 children and was widowed when Dash was just 2. Beth was very well known in  Mount Thomas, and very knowledgeable about everything to do with the town and its inhabitants. (On more than one occasion Sergeant Croyden told Dash he didn't want to hear any of her mothers gossip in the station, yet other times the stories she had heard from her mother came in helpful when looking for suspects) She was a member of local Mount Thomas women's groups and got along with everyone in Mount Thomas. She was killed in season 6 in a car accident, this made Dash consider her future and she resigned from the forcePortrayed by Pauline Terry-Bietz, 1996 – 1999 Charlie McKinley 
Charlie McKinley was a fictional recurring character in the long-running series Blue Heelers. He played the older brother to constable Dash McKinley and had a primary school aged daughter who was often compared to dash, as a bit of a loudmouth and troublemaker.Portrayed by Kevin Harrington, 1997 – 1999, 2003 David Murray 
David Murray was a fictional character in the long-running Australian police drama Blue Heelers. He played a lawyer late in the series and had a relationship with Kelly; they moved in together in season 13.Portrayed by Joshua Lawson, 2006 N 

 Sean Neale 
Sean Neale was a fictional character in the long-running Australian police drama Blue Heelers. He was a detective based at district headquarters in St Davids, Neale had a relationship with Maggie Doyle but after twice finding himself under suspicion for corruption he departed for a fresh start in Melbourne.Portrayed by Richard Huggett, 1997 Stacey Norse 
Stacey Norse was a fictional character in the long-running Australian police drama Blue Heelers. She was married to Adam after she became pregnant with, what Adam thought was, his baby, which she miscarried. She left the series in the same year she arrived, 1997, when she and her former boyfriend (The Father of the Miscarried baby) got back together, and tried to kill Adam, so she could have the insurance money for starting her new life, their plot was revealed and they were taken into custodyPortrayed by Kate Atkinson, 1997 P 

 Sasha Peters 
Sasha Peters was a fictional character in the long-running Australian police drama Blue Heelers. Sasha entered the series as the wife of one of Nick's friends, but her life took a tragic turn when her husband was killed in a high-speed chase during a speed blitz. Sasha grew close to Nick but their relationship suffered after her brother was arrested by the Heelers.Portrayed by Jane Longhurst, 1995 Merv Poole 
Merv Poole was a fictional character on Blue Heelers.Portrayed by Peter Aanensen, 1997 – 2004 Keith Purvis 
Keith Purvis was a fictional character in the long-running Australian police drama Blue Heelers. He was a real "fair-dinkum" farmer and was always there to cause a stir when the copper were quiet. He considered himself very patriotic and felt it was his right, or maybe his responsibility, to preside over things and sort out the problems in the community. Using force if necessary, it was not a rare sight to see him strutting around with a gun in his hand, despite having had his gun licence revoked.Portrayed by Reg Evans, 1995 – 1999 R 

 "Richo" 
Richo was a fictional character in Blue Heelers.Portrayed by Stuart Baker, 1995 – 2004 Tim Ryan 
Tim Ryan was a fictional character in the long-running Australian police drama Blue Heelers from 1998 until 1999.Portrayed by Grant Piro, 1998 – 1999 T 

 Robyn Taylor Senior Constable Robyn Taylor was a character initially a character who came to Mount Thomas as part of the Accident Investigation Squad, she expressed an interest in moving to the country, She was soon Gazetted to the Accident Investigation Squad St David's. She, her husband and fourteen-month-old daughter settled on land in Mount Thomas, with the aim of starting a vineyard. She was lent to Mount Thomas for the remainder of Maggie's time in witness protection but, when her husband was charged with major fraud, she and her daughter returned to Melbourne.Portrayed by Belinda McClory, 1999 Tony Timms 
Tony Timms was a fictional character in the long-running Australian police drama Blue Heelers. He was Mount Thomas' less than helpful journalist and wrote primarily for the Mount Thomas gazette. He was involved in many dramas in Mount Thomas and was quite often a bit of a problem for the local coppers from 1997–2005.Portrayed by Jeremy Kewley, 1997 – 2005 W 

 Jack Woodley 
Senior Detective Jack Woodley was a fictional character in the long-running Australian police drama Blue Heelers who appeared for episodes in the third series (1996). He was initially the replacement officer after Patterson died and came from the Armed Robbery Squad in Melbourne. He came as a surprise to everyone at the station because they all believed they would get a young probationary constable, not an experienced city detective. He had a wife and two children and was aiming on having a quiet country life in Mount Thomas. In his first episode, he and PJ were investigating the burglary and assault of a police widow and, to speed things up, Jack planted evidence on the main suspect, this wasn't noticed at the time. He later planted evidence on another innocent man in the murder case of a shearer and this led PJ to believe something was going on. In his fourth episode, after PJ had done some investigating, he found out that Jack had been falsifying evidence and he had a big decision on his hands – report it and get Jack dismissed and also lose the case which Maggie was about to prosecute, or do nothing and win the case. He decided he would have to tell the truth and Jack was dismissed from the police force.Portrayed by Frankie J. Holden, 1996''

References 

Blue Heelers